Awgu is the Headquarters of Awgu Local Government Area (LGA) in Enugu State, Nigeria and the Headquarters of Awgu Catholic Diocese. The Catholic Cathedral is said to resemble a space ship when viewed with Google Earth. The town is also the Orientation Training Centre for National Youth Service corps members posted to Enugu State. Geographically, Awgu LGA is located approximately between latitudes 06 00’ and 06 19’ North of the Equator and longitudes 07 23’ and 07 35’ East of the Greenwich Meridian. Awgu LGA is bounded in the north by Udi and Nkanu West LGAs, in the west by Oji River LGA , Aninri LGA and Ivo LGA of Ebonyi State in the East and share border with umunneochi L.G.A of Abia State in the south. The name of the Traditional ruler is Egbeleli. The market is known as Orie Awgu.

History 
The present Awgu LGA was created out of the greater Awgu Local government area which included Aninri and Oji River local government areas. It has a population of 390,681, according to the 2006 census. Out this, 95,421 are males while 102,713 are females. The distribution of population is uneven; a few areas are densely populated while many others areas are virtually uninhabitable. Majority of the population settle at the foot of the hills because of the difficulty posed by the rugged terrain and because the lowland have richer soil which support better crop yield. A study by Mozie, Arinze T.  at the Department of Geography, University of Nigeria found that the settlement pattern on the hills is clustered with a nearest neighbour index of 0.82 while settlement pattern on the lowland area is dispersed with a nearest neighbour index of 1.72.

The other towns in Awgu Local Government Area are: Agbogugu, Isu-Awa, Ituku, Ihe, Ogbaku, Owelli, Ogugu, Agbudu, Amoli, Mmaku, Ugbo, Obeagu, Mgbidi, Ugwueme, Nkwe, Ezere, Awgu, Nenwenta, Awgunta and Mgbowo.

Geography 
Awgu is marked by extensive hills especially in the western flank and lowland in the eastern side. These hills have steep slopes and could attain an altitude of about 350–400 meters above sea level with mean slope angle of 15o and a modal class of 11o.  The area is marked by shales, sandstones and escarpment. Awgu formation is composed of bluish and gray, well-bedded shales which are occasionally intercalated with calcareous sandstones and shelly limestone. Also, fine to coarse grained, massive sandstone, locally cross-bedded with some pebble beds and subordinate bands of siltstone and carbonaceous shale are present. The Awgu formation is the youngest of the folded sequence in the Igbo land (Southeastern Nigeria).

Awgu is drained mainly by seasonal finger-like springs and streams. They dry up during the dry season (November- March) and yield more water in the wet season (April to October). Most of the streams obtain their source from top of the hills and flow downhill. In the rainy season runoffs are collected by the streams thereby increasing their volume and velocity. Due to the muddy nature of the streams channels, the water is usually colored after heavy downpour. The streams carry a lot of debris as they flow from their source (hill top) to the settlement areas down hill (lower course). The stream load (debris) makes the water dirty therefore not suitable for domestic use. Many people that reside at the very lower course of the streams are affected and they have to trek up to the middle course (foot of the hills) to collect water. The area lies within the guinea Savannah vegetation zone. Vegetation in the study area varies with topography. Natural vegetation is denser at the valley and sparse at the top of the hills. Graminoids cover the area while trees are dominant on the plain. The top and slope face of the hills are more covered by grasses such as Andropogon gayanus, Ctenium spp, Hyparrhenia barteri etc. The common tree species found are Isoberlina doka, Anona senegalensis etc. This pattern of vegetation has been ascribed to relative dryness during the dry season, favorable soil conditions and human interference in bush burning. On the hills, shattered sites have trees dominating in colonies and that these colonies in shattered sites are characterized by favorable soils and soil water holding capacity.

Notable people 
Father Mbaka, Prominent religious leader
Engr Sunday N Okereke, former G/M Nigercem Nkalagu

Economy 
The major economic activity for majority of the population is subsistence farming and crops such as cassava, yam, cocoyam, vegetables, maize, etc. are grown.  Bush fallowing, mixed cropping and shifting cultivation are some of their farming practices. Livestock rearing is also common among some of the people. Palm wine extraction and stone quarrying are other economic activities also undertaken in Awgu. The major market in Awgu LGA is the Oye market. Various farm products are traded in the market on wholesale and retail basis every four days. Many of the people take their farm produce to sell in the market in exchange for other commodities they cannot produce. People from Nkanu and Enugu urban also patronize the traders in this market especially for cassava and vegetables.

References

Local Government Areas in Igboland
Local Government Areas in Enugu State
Cities in Enugu State